Elections to South Hams District Council took place on 5 May, the same day as other United Kingdom local elections and the Alternative Vote referendum. 27 of the 30 wards were up for election, each with either 1,2 or 3 councillors to be elected. The number of seats up for election in each ward is indicated by the number in the brackets following the ward name. 37 of the 40 councillors elected in 2007 defend their seats in this year. The three wards of Ivybridge Central, Newton & Noss and Thurlestone were uncontested, only having one candidate each, so no election took place. The candidates were Michael Francis Saltern, Suzie Cooper and Ian Bramble respectively; all of whom were from the Conservative Party.

Results summary

Ward elections

Allington and Loddiswell

Avon and Harbourne

Bickleigh & Shaugh (2)

Charterlands

Cornwood and Sparkwell

Dartington

Dartmouth (Townstal)

Dartmouth and Kingswear (3)

East Dart

Eastmoor

Erme Valley (2)

Ivybridge Filham (2)

Ivybridge Woodlands (2)

Kingsbridge East

Kingsbridge North

Marldon

Salcombe and Malborough (2)

Saltstone

Skerries

South Brent

Stokenham

Totnes Bridgetown (2)

Totnes Town (2)

Wembury and Brixton (2)

West Dart

Westville and Alvington

Yealmpton

References

2011 English local elections
2011
2000s in Devon